John Thure Charles Walentin Svahlstedt (born May 2, 1947), dubbed Södermannen, Hagamannen and Fönstermannen by the police and media alike, is a Swedish serial rapist active in the areas of Södermalm, Stockholm and Haga, Gothenburg from the 1970s to 1980s.

Crimes 
Armed with a knife and wearing a mask, Svahlstedt first started raping women in Gothenburg's Haga district from 1971 to 1973. When he was arrested, he admitted a total of 13 rapes, and was sentenced to four years of imprisonment for 26 assaults. He then received the nickname "Hagamannen". After his release from prison, he moved to Stockholm.

In the summer of 1982, Svahlstedt resumed his activities in the Södermalm district of Stockholm. His modus operandi was to climb through open windows at night, earning him another nickname - "Södermannen". In 1983, at 35 years old, he was arrested and sent away for forensic psychiatric care at the Karsuden Hospital. He never admitted his guilt, but was still convicted of six counts of rape, two counts of sexual assault, deprivation of liberty, unlawful infringement and fraud. In the same year, he escaped abroad and was put on Interpol's wanted list. Two years later, he was arrested at Arlanda Airport. In 1987, he was discharged from Karsuden Hospital.

In 2013, Svahlstedt was convicted of raping a minor and purchasing child pornography, after raping a young girl for two years. He was given four years imprisonment for this.

References

External links 
 P3 Dokumentär: Södermannen

1947 births
20th-century Swedish criminals
21st-century Swedish criminals
Escapees
Fugitives
Living people
People convicted of child pornography offenses
People convicted of fraud
People convicted of sexual assault
Prisoners and detainees of Sweden
Swedish people convicted of child sexual abuse
Swedish people convicted of rape
Swedish prisoners and detainees